The 2012 ASP World Championship Tour was a professional competitive surfing league run by the Association of Surfing Professionals. Men and women competed in separate tours with events taking place from late February to mid-December, at various surfing locations around the world.

Surfers received points for their best events. The surfer with the most points at the end of the tour was announced the 2012 ASP World Tour Champion.

ASP World Championship Tour

Event Schedule

Source

Final standings
Source

ASP Women’s World Championship Tour

Event Schedule

Source

Final standings
Source

External links
 Official Site

World Surf League
ASP World Tour